The Kansas City Marathon is a  race run the 3rd Saturday of every October in Kansas City, Missouri, United States, first held in 1979.  It is the second largest marathon in Missouri, with 1227 finishers in 2019. An official time from the Kansas City Marathon can be used to qualify for the Boston Marathon.

It includes a 5K, 10K and half-marathon in addition to the traditional marathon race.

History 

The marathon was first held in 1979 as the Macy's Marathon.

In 2005, the marathon was just under  short.

The 2020 in-person edition of the race was cancelled due to the coronavirus pandemic, with all registrants given the option of transferring their entry to 2021, or entering a charity running program and obtaining a partial refund.

Course 

While the course varies from year to year, it generally involves running from Crown Center through downtown, turning to Midtown to Westport. From Westport it continues on to the Plaza out to Waldo, returning to the 18th and Vine district and ending on Main Street by Pershing.

Qualification 

In order to run in the Kansas City Full Marathon, one must be eighteen years or older on the date of the marathon. However, if anyone under eighteen years old has a permission slip signed by their parents as well as a signed waiver, they may run in the full marathon.

Winners

Marathon

Half marathon

External links

Official site
Past results and reviews
Kansas City Marathon presented by Garmin Race Information
I-35 Challenge
Course map of full marathon in 2019
2017 Marathon Results
2017 Half Marathon Results
2017 10K Results
2017 5K Results

References

Marathons in the United States
Sports in the Kansas City metropolitan area